Ford Building may refer to:

 Ford Building (San Diego), part of the California Pacific International Exposition that now houses the San Diego Air & Space Museum
 Ford House Office Building, Washington, DC building used by the U.S. House of Representatives
 Ford Building (Detroit), downtown office building; tallest in Michigan (1909-1913)
 Ford Foundation Building, New York City structure by architect Kevin Roche
 Ford Building (Fairfax, Virginia), home to Antonia Ford, a confederate spy in the Civil War